Hualin could refer to the following locations in China:

Hualin Township (桦林乡), Wushan County, Gansu
Hualin Road Subdistrict (化林路街道), Fuxing District, Handan, Hebei
Hualin, Heilongjiang (桦林镇), town in Yangming District, Mudanjiang
Hualin, Jiangxi (华林镇), town in Xingzi County
Hualin Temple (disambiguation)